Yueyaquan is a crescent-shaped lake in an oasis, 6 km south of the city of Dunhuang in Gansu Province, China.

History
The lake was named Yueyaquan in the Qing Dynasty. Mildred Cable and Francesca French visited the lake during their travels in the region in 1932 and recorded their impressions in their book The Gobi Desert: "All around us we saw tier on tier of lofty sand-hills, giving the lie to our quest, yet when, with a final desperate effort, we hoisted ourselves over the last ridge and looked down on what lay beyond, we saw the lake below, and its beauty was entrancing."

In the early 1990s, it had shrunk to an average depth of one meter. In 2006, the local government with help of the central government started to fill the lake and restore its depth; its depth and size have been growing yearly since then. Proposed groundwater diversions are modeled to raise the water table and level of the lake.

The lake and the surrounding deserts are very popular with tourists, who are offered camel and all-terrain vehicle rides.

References 

Dunhuang
Bodies of water of Gansu
Lakes of China
Oases of China